Minneconjou Creek is a stream in the U.S. state of South Dakota.

Minneconjou Creek has the name of the Minneconjou Indians.

See also
List of rivers of South Dakota

References

Rivers of Stanley County, South Dakota
Rivers of South Dakota